VH1 Live! is a late-night talk show that currently airs on VH1. Hosted by Marc Lamont Hill, the show focuses on pop culture, current events, and the lives of VH1 personalities.

Episodes

References

External links 
 - Episode Guide

VH1 original programming
2010s American late-night television series
2016 American television series debuts
2016 American television series endings
English-language television shows